Wasiak is a surname. Notable people with the surname include:

Maria Wasiak (born 1960), Polish businesswoman
Stan Wasiak (1920–1992), American baseball player and manager